The 2006 Los Angeles County Board of Supervisors elections were held on June 6, 2006, coinciding with the California gubernatorial election, 2006. Two of the five seats (for the First and Third Districts) of the Los Angeles County Board of Supervisors were contested in this election. None of the incumbents were termed out.

Results

First District

Third District

References

External links 
Los Angeles County Department of Registrar-Recorder/County Clerk

Los Angeles County Board of Supervisors
Los Angeles County Board of Supervisors elections
Los Angeles County